Vittorio Missoni (1954 – January 4, 2013; confirmed June 27, 2013) was an Italian CEO of Missoni, the fashion house founded by his parents in 1953. Missoni is credited with expanding Missoni into a global brand after his parents handed control to him and his two siblings, Angela and Luca, in 1996.

Missoni was born in Gallarate, Lombardy, Italy, in 1954, to Ottavio and Rosita Missoni. His parents had opened a small knitwear store in Gallarate in 1953 shortly before he was born. They released their first articles of clothing using the Missoni label in 1958. The company, which is known for a distinctive zigzag knitwear pattern, became successful in Italy during the 1960s. The three Missoni children – Vittorio, Angela and Luca – became involved with the day-to-day operations of the family business.

In 1996, Ottavio and Rosita handed control of the Missoni fashion house to their children. Angela and Luca took responsibility for the creative direction of the Missoni line, while Vittorio Missoni handled the business aspects of the company. Vittorio Missoni initially led the marketing and manufacturing departments of Missoni. However, he was widely credited with expanding the fashion house into a full global brand after becoming Missoni's chief executive officer in Europe and the United States. Under Vittorio Missoni, the company's trademark pattern and name expanded into household and cosmetic products, including perfume and towels. A Missoni Hotel, the first of several locations, debuted in 2009 in Edinburgh, Scotland. In 2011, Missoni partnered with the American retail chain, Target Corporation, to release a line of limited-edition, lower priced Missoni products, which proved so popular with shoppers that Target's web site crashed due to demand.

The plane in which Missoni and his wife were flying, a forty-four-year-old Britten-Norman Islander, disappeared on January 4, 2013, after taking off from Los Roques Airport in the Los Roques archipelago, where they had been vacationing, en route to Caracas, Venezuela. Missoni was 58 years old at the time of the plane's disappearance. His wife, Maurizia Castiglioni, and their friends, Guido Foresti and Elda Scalvenzi, as well as two crew members were also on board the plane. The search for the missing aircraft took more than six months. His father, Ottavio, died in May 2013, before the plane was located.

On June 27, 2013, it was confirmed that Missoni's plane was found in the Caribbean Sea, north of the Los Roques archipelago. The aircraft was located by the crew of C&C Technologies' research vessel Sea Scout, an oceanographic ship, on the fifth day of their search for Missoni.

See also
Transaereo BN-2A-27 Islander crash

References

1954 births
2013 deaths
Italian chief executives
Italian hoteliers
People from Gallarate
Victims of aviation accidents or incidents in 2013